Richard Rowe (born 11 November 1959) is a National Hunt racehorse trainer and a former jockey in the United Kingdom.

Career as a jockey
 1984 - LILAC NOVICES HURDLE WINNER (Paddy Boro)
 1982 - Whitbread Gold Cup winner Shady Deal
 1988 - Scilly Isles Novices' Chase winner Yeoman Broker
 1988 - Galloway Braes Novices' Chase winner Saffron Lord

Career as trainer
 1998 - Kingwell Hurdle winner I'm Supposin
 1999 - Whitbread Gold Cup winner Eulogy
 2000 - Dovecote Novices' Hurdle winner Hariymi

References

External links
 Richard Rowe website

British racehorse trainers
English jockeys
Living people
1959 births